Illinois Route 68 (IL 68) is a  east–west state highway in the northeastern part of the U.S. state of Illinois. It travels east from IL 72 (Higgins Road) in the Dundee area to the concurrency of Interstate 94 (I-94)/U.S. Route 41 (US 41) (Edens Expressway) in Glencoe.

Route description

IL 68 is called Dundee Road east of IL 25. It is known as Penny Avenue in East Dundee. East, in Glencoe, it continues as a local road to Green Bay Road.

The Dundee area refers to the cities of East Dundee and West Dundee. The towns are named after Dundee, Scotland, the hometown of a young settler who won the naming rights in a competition.

History
State Bond Issue (SBI) Route 68 originally traveled from Lake Bluff to the Wisconsin state line on what is now IL 131 and US 41. IL 68 was changed to these routes from 1935 through 1937.  In 1942, it was moved to the current IL 68 between IL 59 and then IL 42, which is still Sheridan Road to this day. In 1972, IL 68 was dropped east of US 41, which today is also I-94. The next year, it was extended west to East Dundee, replacing IL 63 and IL 22A.

Major intersections

See also

References

External links

 Illinois Highway Ends: Illinois Route 68

068
Transportation in Kane County, Illinois
Transportation in Cook County, Illinois
Palatine, Illinois
Wheeling, Illinois
Northbrook, Illinois
Glencoe, Illinois
U.S. Route 41